Vernon is a masculine given name which may refer to:

People
 Vernon Abeysekera, Postmaster General of Sri Lanka from 1969–1970
 Vernon Adams (born 1993), American football quarterback
 Vernon Baker (1919–2010), Medal of Honor recipient
 Vernon Bell, founder of the British karate movement
 Vernon Bogdanor (born 1943), British Research Professor
 Vernon Carey Jr. (born 2001), American basketball player
 Vernon Coaker (born 1953), British politician
 Vernon Campbell, American film actor
 Vernon Carrington, Rastafarian, founder of the Twelve Tribes of Israel
 Vernon Castle (1887–1918), stage name of American ballroom dancer and dance teacher William Vernon Blyth
 Choi Hansol, better known as Vernon Chwe (born 1998), Korean-American singer and rapper (Seventeen)
 Vernon Coleman (born 1946), English author
 Vernon Herbert Coleman (1898–1978) American artist and art teacher
 Vernon Cooray, Sri Lankan Sinhala electrical engineer and professor
 Vernon Corea (1927–2002), Sri Lankan radio broadcaster
 Vernon Davis (born 1984), American football player
 Vernon Dean (born 1959), American former professional football player
 Vernon Lee Evans (born 1949), American contract killer
 Vernon Forrest (1971–2009), American boxer
 Vernon Simeon Plemion Grant (1902–1990), American illustrator known for gnomes and fairy tales
 Vernon Gholston, NFL player for the New York Jets
 Vernon Hartshorn (1872–1931), Welsh trade unionist and Labour Party politician
 Vernon Huber, 36th Governor of American Samoa
 Vernon Jarrett (1918–2004), African-American journalist and commentator
 Vernon K. Jensen (1912-1982), American veterinarian and politician
 Vernon Jonklaas, Sri Lankan Burgher lawyer and politician
 Vernon Jordan (1935–2021), American business executive and civil rights activist
 Vernon Kay (born 1974), British DJ and television presenter
 Vernon Lattin (born 1938), American president of Brooklyn College
 Vernon Lewis (American football) (born 1970), American football player
 Vernon Lewis (footballer) (1881–1941), English amateur footballer and minor counties cricketer
 Vernon Mendis (1925–2010), Sri Lankan Sinhala diplomat
 Vernon C. Miller (1896–1933), American murder victim
 Vernon R. Morris (born 1963), American atmospheric scientist
 Vernon Pahl (born 1957), Canadian football player
 Vernon Philander (born 1985), South African cricketer
 Vernon Presley (1916–1979), father of Elvis Presley
 Vernon Reed (1871–1963), New Zealand politician
 Vernon Reid (born 1958), American guitarist and songwriter, founder and primary songwriter of the rock band Living Colour
 Vernon Roberson (born 1952), American football player
 Vernon Scott (born 1997), American football player
 Vernon L. Smith, American economist
 Vernon L. Sommerdorf (1921-2009), American physician and politician
 Vernon K. Stevenson (1812 1884), American businessman
 Vernon Wallace Thomson (1905–1988), American lawyer and politician
 Vernon L. Walker (1894–1948), American special effects artist
 Vernon A. Walters (1917–2002), American diplomat
 Vernon Weddle (born 1935), American film, stage and television actor
 Vernon S. Welch (1906-1980), American lawyer, businessman, and politician
 Vernon Wells, American baseball player
 Vernon Wells (actor) (born 1945), Australian actor

Fictional characters
 Vernon Dursley, Harry Potter's uncle from the Harry Potter novels and movies
 Vernon Schillinger, leader of the Aryans on the HBO series Oz
 Vernon Tomlin, ex-cellarman and potman at the Rovers Return Inn in Coronation Street
 Vernon Roche, Commander of the Temerian Special Forces in The Witcher (video game series)

See also
 Vern, a given name, often short for Vernon

English masculine given names
English-language masculine given names